Djenairo Gillian Noell Daniels (born 7 January 2002) is a Dutch professional footballer who plays as a forward for Canadian Premier League club Pacific FC.

Early life
At age 11, he had a trial with the youth system of PSV Eindhoven, but then joined the youth system of Almere City, where he played for the next six years. In July 2018, he joined the youth system of PSV Eindhoven at the age of sixteen, signing a three-year contract.

Club career
He made his senior debut for PSV's second team Jong PSV in the second tier Eerste Divisie on August 29, 2020 against Excelsior Rotterdam. He scored his first professional goal on October 2, 2020 against SC Telstar. After not getting any opportunities with the first team, he was allowed to leave the club in January 2021.

In January 2021, he signed a contract with FC Utrecht until 2023 with an option for a further season, where he would initially join the second team Jong Utrecht. In September 2021, he went on loan to Italian club Sassuolo, with an option to purchase him permanently at the conclusion of the loan. He was assigned to the Sassuolo U19 squad. In February 2022, his loan was terminated and he also terminated his contract with Utrecht by mutual consent.

In February 2022, he signed with Canadian Premier League club Pacific FC. Daniels scored his first goal for Pacific on June 30, netting the opener in an eventual 3-3 draw with Cavalry FC. After the season, he re-signed with the club for the 2023 season.

International career
Born in the Netherlands, Daniels is of Surinamese descent. He was named to the Netherlands U17 roster for the 2019 UEFA European Under-17 Championship and 2019 FIFA U-17 World Cup. He also was named to the Netherlands U18 in a four nations mini-tournament in 2019.

Career statistics

References

External links
Djenairo Daniels at Ons Oranje

2002 births
Living people
Association football forwards
Dutch footballers
Netherlands youth international footballers
Dutch sportspeople of Surinamese descent
Almere City FC players
PSV Eindhoven players
Jong PSV players
Jong FC Utrecht players
U.S. Sassuolo Calcio players
Pacific FC players
Eerste Divisie players
Canadian Premier League players
Dutch expatriate footballers
Expatriate footballers in Italy
Dutch expatriate sportspeople in Italy
Expatriate soccer players in Canada
Dutch expatriate sportspeople in Canada